Suisheng Zhao (Chinese: 赵穗生; born September 17, 1954) is a professor of Chinese politics and foreign policy at the University of Denver's Josef Korbel School of International Studies. He serves as director of the school's Center for China–US Cooperation, and is the founding editor and the editor-in-chief of the multidisciplinary Journal of Contemporary China.

Prior to arriving at the University of Denver, Zhao was an associate professor of political science at Washington College and an associate professor of East Asian politics at Colby College.  He received both a bachelor's and master's degree in economics from Peking University, and subsequently completed a second master's degree in sociology from the University of Missouri. Zhao earned his PhD in political science from the University of California, San Diego.

Publications

Monographs
 The Dragon Roars Back: Transformational Leaders and Dynamics of Chinese Foreign Policy (2023)
 A Nation-State by Construction: Dynamics of Modern Chinese Nationalism (2004)
 Power Competition in East Asia: From the Old Chinese World Order to Post-cold War Regional Multipolarity (1998, St. Martin's Press)
 Power by Design: Constitution-Making in Nationalist China (1995)

Edited volumes
 The Making of China's Foreign Policy in the 21st century: Historical Sources, Institutions/Players, and Perceptions of Power Relations (2018)
 China’s Big Power Ambition under Xi Jinping: Narratives and Driving Forces (2021)
 China’s Global Reach: The Belt and Road Initiative (BRI) and Asian Infrastructure Investment Bank (AIIB), Volume II (2020)
 China’s New Global Strategy: The Belt and Road Initiative (BRI) and Asian Infrastructure Investment Bank (AIIB), Volume I (2019)
 Chinese Authoritarianism in the Information Age: Internet, Media, and Public Opinion (2019)
 Debating Regime Legitimacy in Contemporary China: Popular Protests and Regime Performances (2018)
 China in Africa: Strategic Motives and Economic Interests (2017)
 Construction of Chinese Nationalism in the Early 21st Century: Domestic Sources and International Implications (2014)
 China’s Search for Energy Security: Domestic Sources and International Implications (2014)
 China and East Asian Regionalism: Economic and Security Cooperation and Institution-Building (2012)
 China and the United States: Cooperation and Competition in Northeast Asia (2008)
 China-US Relations Transformed: Perspectives and Strategic Interactions (2007)
 Debating Political Reform in China: Rule of Law versus Democratization (2006, M.E.Sharpe)
 Chinese Foreign Policy: Pragmatism and Strategic Behavior (2003, M.E.Sharpe)
 China and Democracy: Reconsidering the Prospects for a Democratic China (2000)
 Across the Taiwan Strait: Mainland China, Taiwan, and the Crisis of 1995-96 (1999)

Co-edited volumes 
 Decision-making in Deng's China: Perspectives from Insiders (Studies on Contemporary China (M.E. Sharpe Paperback)) (2019)
 Grassroots Elections in China (2014)
 In Search of China’s Development Model: Beyond the Beijing Consensus (2011)

Articles 
 "From Affirmative to Assertive Patriots: Nationalism in Xi Jinping’s China." The Washington Quarterly44.4 (2021): 141-161.
 "Rethinking the Chinese World Order: The Imperial Cycle and the Rise of China." Journal of Contemporary China 24.96 (2015): 961-982.
 "Foreign Policy Implications of Chinese Nationalism Revisited: The Strident Turn." Journal of Contemporary China 22.82 (2013): 535-553.
"The China Model: Can It Replace the Western Model of Modernization?." Journal of Contemporary China 19.65 (2010): 419-436.
"China’s Global Search for Energy Security: Cooperation and Competition in Asia–Pacific." Journal of Contemporary China 17.55 (2008): 207-227.
"China's Pragmatic Nationalism: Is It Manageable?." The Washington Quarterly 29.1 (2005): 131-144.
"Chinese Nationalism and Its International Orientations." Political Science Quarterly 115.1 (2000): 1-33.
"A State-led Nationalism: The Patriotic Education Campaign in Post-Tiananmen China." Communist and Post-communist Studies 31.3 (1998): 287-302.
"Chinese Intellectuals′ Quest for National Greatness and Nationalistic Writing in the 1990s." The China Quarterly 152 (1997): 725-745.
"Deng Xiaoping's Southern Tour: Elite Politics in Post-Tiananmen China." Asian Survey 33.8 (1993): 739-756.

References

Living people
Chinese political scientists
Peking University alumni
University of Missouri alumni
University of California, San Diego alumni
University of Denver faculty
Washington College faculty
Colby College faculty
Year of birth missing (living people)